The Huntington–Hill method is a method for proportional allocation of the seats in a representative assembly by minimizing the percentage differences in the number of constituents represented by each seat. 
Edward Huntington formulated this approach, building on the earlier work of Joseph Adna Hill, and called it the method of equal proportions. Since 1941, this method has been used to apportion the 435 seats in the United States House of Representatives following the completion of each decennial census.  

The method assigns seats by finding a modified divisor D such that each constituency's priority quotient (its population divided by D), using the geometric mean of the lower and upper quota for the divisor, yields the correct number of seats that minimizes the percentage differences in the size of subconstituencies.  

Although no legislature uses this method of apportionment to assign seats to parties after an election, it was considered for House of Lords elections under the ill-fated House of Lords Reform Bill.

Apportionment Method

In this method, as a first step, each of the 50 states is given its one guaranteed seat in the House of Representatives, leaving 385 seats to assign. The remaining seats are allocated one at a time, to the state with the highest priority number. Thus, the 51st seat would go to the most populous state (currently California). The priority number is determined by the ratio of the state population to the geometric mean of the number of seats it currently holds in the assignment process, n (initially 1), and the number of seats it would hold if the seat were assigned to it, n+1. Symbolically, the priority number An is

where P is the population of the state, and n is the number of seats it currently holds before the possible allocation of the next seat.  An equivalent, recursive definition is

where n is still the number of seats the state has before allocation of the next (in other words, for the mth allocation, n = m-1, where m > 1), and for n = 1, the initial A1 is explicitly defined by the non-recursive formula as

Consider the reapportionment following the 2010 U.S. census: beginning with all states initially being allocated one seat, the largest value of A1 corresponds to the largest state, California, which is allocated seat 51. After being allocated its 2nd seat, its priority value decreases to its A2 value, which is reordered to a position back in line. The 52nd seat goes to Texas, the 2nd largest state, because its A1 priority value is larger than the An of any other state. However, the 53rd seat goes back to California because its A2 priority value is larger than the An of any other state. The 54th seat goes to New York because its A1 priority value is larger than the An of any other state at this point. This process continues until all remaining seats are assigned. Each time a state is assigned a seat, n is incremented by 1, causing its priority value to be reduced and reordered among the states, whereupon another state normally rises to the top of the list.

Legislative Elections

In a legislative election under the Huntington–Hill method, after the votes have been tallied, the qualification value would be calculated. This step is necessary because in an election, unlike in a legislative apportionment, not all parties are always guaranteed at least one seat. If the legislature concerned has no exclusion threshold, the qualification value could be a predefined quota, such as the Hare, Droop, or Imperiali quota.

In legislatures which use an exclusion threshold, the qualification value would be equipotent to the threshold, that is:

where
 total votes is the total valid poll; that is, the number of valid (unspoilt) votes cast in an election.
 total seats is the total number of seats to be filled in the election.

Every party polling votes equal to or greater than the qualification value would be given an initial number of seats, again varying if whether or not there is a threshold:

In legislatures which do not use an exclusion threshold, the initial number would be 1, but in legislatures which do, the initial number of seats would be:

with all fractional remainders being rounded up.

In legislatures elected under a mixed-member proportional system, the initial number of seats would be further modified by adding the number of single-member district seats won by the party before any allocation.

Determining the qualification value is not necessary when distributing seats in a legislature among states pursuant to census results, where all states are guaranteed a fixed number of seats, either one (as in the US) or a greater number, which may be uniform (as in Brazil) or vary between states (as in Canada).

It can also be skipped if the Huntington-Hill system is used in the nationwide stage of a national remnant system, because the only qualified parties are those which obtained seats at the subnational stage.

After all qualified parties or states received their initial seats, successive quotients are calculated, as in other Highest Averages methods, for each qualified party or state, and seats would be repeatedly allocated to the party or state having the highest quotient until there are no more seats to allocate.
The formula of quotients calculated under the Huntington–Hill method is

where:
 V is the population of the state or the total number of votes that party received, and
 n is the number of seats that the state or party has been allocated so far.

Because squaring does not change the relative order of positive values, one can avoid the square root by instead comparing the values

Example
Even though the Huntington–Hill system was designed to distribute seats in a legislature among states pursuant to census results, it can also be used, when putting parties in the place of states and votes in place of population, for the mathematically equivalent task of distributing seats among parties pursuant to an election results in a party-list proportional representation system. A party-list PR system requires large multi-member districts to function effectively.

In this example, 230,000 voters decide the disposition of 8 seats among 4 parties. Unlike the D'Hondt and Sainte-Laguë systems, which allow the allocation of seats by calculating successive quotients right away, the Huntington–Hill system requires each party or state have at least one seat to avoid a division by zero error. In the U.S. House of Representatives, this is ensured by guaranteeing each state at least one seat; in a single-stage PR election under the Huntington–Hill system, however, the first stage would be to calculate which parties are eligible for an initial seat.

This could be done by excluding any parties which polled less than a predefined quota, and giving every party which polled at least the quota one seat.

In this case, the qualified parties stay the same regardless of quota.

Each eligible party is assigned one seat. With all the initial seats assigned, the remaining five seats are distributed by a priority number calculated as follows. The 5 highest entries, marked with asterisks, range from 70,711 down to 28,868. For each, the corresponding party gets another seat.

For comparison, the "Proportionate seats" column shows the exact fractional numbers of seats due, calculated in proportion to the number of votes received (For example).  If the "Total Seats" column is less than the "Proportionate seats" column (Parties C and D in this example) the party is under-represented.  Conversely, if the "Total Seats" column is greater than the "Proportionate seats" column (Parties A and B in this example) the party is over-represented.

If the number of seats was equal in size to the number of votes cast, this method would guarantee that the apportionments would equal the vote shares of each party.

In this example, the results of the apportionment is identical to one under the D'Hondt system. However, as the District magnitude increases, differences emerge: all 120 members of the Knesset, Israel's unicameral legislature, are elected under the D'Hondt method. Had the Huntington–Hill method, rather than the D'Hondt method, been used to apportion seats following the elections to the 20th Knesset, held in 2015, the 120 seats in the 20th Knesset would have been apportioned as follows:

Compared with the actual apportionment, Kulanu would have lost one seat, while The Jewish Home would have gained one seat.

Footnotes

References

Apportionment methods